Yuanwang digital mall is a large trade center in Huaqiangbei. It is the spine of a concentrated mobile, tablet and accessories shopping area.

The scope of the mall's business includes electronic and communication products retail and wholesale, electronic components, sales agents, the Internet e-commerce, investment and development, real estate development, musical instruments operations, market management and so on.

Yuanwang Digital Mall, a subsidiary of Pangyuan Group, is located in the heart of Huaqiang North section, Shenzhen, with a business area of 30,000 square meters. It win the honour of the world's largest "one-stop" cellphone and digital products procurement center, attracting more than 60% of the bulk purchases customers around the country. the business also expands towards Hong Kong and Macao. More than 50 countries and regions around the world have been its customers. There are more than ten thousand direct employees and the average daily flow of customers is more than a hundred thousand people, with a daily trading volume of over one Thousand million. Yuangwang Digital Mall encapsulate almost all brands of cell phones, digital products and accessories. It has taken the shape of Marine Carrier digital mall with its priority over services, scaling, management, e-commerce capacity and partnership contacts.

References

Futian District
Electronics districts

zh:华强北